The Ninetology Insight (I9430) is a smart mobile phone manufactured by Ninetology with dual SIM capabilities. It is running on a dual core (1.0 GHz) processor and utilizes the Android Ice Cream Sandwich 4.0 Operating System.

History

Release
The Ninetology Insight (I9430) was announced during the month of January, 2013.

Feature

Hardware
The Ninetology Insight (I9430) has a dual core 1.0 GHz processor and a 4.3-inch capacitive IPS (196 ppi pixel density) display screen with a resolution of 480 X 800, capable of displaying up to 16.7M colors. It possesses a dimension of 126.9 mm (H) X 66.5 mm (W) X 10.8 mm (T) and weighs 160 grams.

It has an 8.0 MP rear camera with face detection function, a LED flash feature, HDR settings and an autofocus function, as well as a 2.0 MP front-facing camera.

The battery has a capacity of Li-Ion 1800 mAh.

Additional storage is available via a MicroSD card socket, which is certified to support up to 32 GB of additional storage.

Software
The Ninetology Insight (I9430) is running on the Android Ice Cream Sandwich 4.0 Operating System and is preloaded with a variety of applications:
 Web: Native Android Browser 
 Social: Facebook, YouTube
 Media: Camera, Gallery, FM Radio, Music Player, Video Player, 
 Personal Information Management: Calendar, Detail Contact Information
 Utilities: Calculator, Alarm Clock, Google Maps, Voice Recorder, M-Warranty

References

External links
http://ninetology.com/malaysia/products_smartphones_insight_details.html

Smartphones
Mobile phones introduced in 2013
Android (operating system) devices